"Sleigh Ride" is the sixteenth and final episode of the third season of the post-apocalyptic horror television series Fear the Walking Dead, which aired on AMC on October 15, 2017 along with the previous episode; "Things Bad Begun".

Plot 
Hiding together, tensions rise between Nick and Madison over Troy's murder and her growing ruthlessness. Proctor John arrives at the dam with Alicia, displeased that Strand wasn't fully able to deliver on their deal; Alicia bargains for Madison's safety. Strand is helping Madison and Nick escape when Lola attacks the Proctors and is killed. For their duplicity John decides to kill all four, starting with Alicia as a mercy. Nick uses the detonator in a standoff, threatening to blow up the dam. Madison, Alicia and Strand escape on a boat. The Proctors begin to move on Nick who receives unexpected help from Walker and Crazy Dog who snipe from a nearby hilltop and Daniel who fights his way across the dam. Nick detonates the explosives, blowing a hole in the dam and the boat is carried through by the current. Nick and Daniel escape while Madison swims to shore alone.

Production
This is the last episode for a departing Dave Erickson as a showrunner. This marks the final appearance of Kim Dickens as Madison alive in the present (since her appearances in season 4 are only flashbacks) until her return in season 7. This is also the final season to have Paul Haslinger as the composer of the series as he is replaced the following season by Danny Bensi and Saunder Jurriaans. This season is the last to feature the original Fear the Walking Dead logo, which was redesigned for the next season's semi-reboot.

Casting
This episode marks the final appearance of several characters. It is the last appearance of Troy Otto (Daniel Sharman) and Lola Guerrero (Lisandra Tena), who were both killed during the episode, and with their deaths, none of the main characters introduced this season are alive. It is the last appearance of Qaletaqa Walker (Michael Greyeyes), who manages to survive. This episode also marks the last appearance of several characters who died earlier in the season and appear in one of Madison's dreams, including Travis Manawa (Cliff Curtis), Jeremiah Otto (Dayton Callie) and Jake Otto (Sam Underwood).

Reception 
"Sleigh Ride", received critical acclaim from critics. On Rotten Tomatoes, "Sleigh Ride" garnered a perfect 100% rating, with an average score of 8.0/10 based on 7 reviews. In a joint review along with the season finale episode, "Things Bad Begun", Matt Fowler of IGN gave "Sleigh Ride" an 8/10 rating, stating; "Some of the interpersonal moments didn't quite feel right in Fear the Walking Dead's Season 3 close-out, but using the dam as the centerpiece for the endgame, while also introducing a new villain into the mix, made for an exciting finale - even if Madison's haunting dreams were the only thing that resonated emotionally."

Ratings 
The episode was seen by 2.23 million viewers in the United States on its original air date, the same amount of ratings as the previous episodes.

References

2017 American television episodes
Fear the Walking Dead (season 3) episodes